The Statue of Christ the Redeemer of Maratea is a statue of Jesus Christ in Maratea, southern Italy, realized in Carrara marble on the top of the Mountain “St. Biagio".

The sculpture was created by the Florentine sculptor Bruno Innocenti. The entire Statue was completed in 1965.

The idea to realize the Statue was the Count Stefano Rivetti of Valcervo’s, who was also the promoter and financier of the project execution.

The statue
This is the third tallest statue of Jesus in Europe, after Christ the King in Świebodzin, Poland and Cristo-Rei (Christ the King) in Lisbon, and the fifth in the world after Cristo de la Concordia and Christ the Redeemer, both in South America. It is 21,20 metres high, the head is 3 metres in height and the arm-span is 19 metres from finger tip to finger tip.

History
The idea to realize the statue of Christ the Redeemer in Maratea belongs to the Count Stefano Rivetti di Val Cervo, during his trip in Brazil, while he was flying over the Corcovado. When he came back to Italy he asked Bruno Innocenti, professor of the sculpture at the Istitutod’Arte of Florence, to realize the big statue of the Christ the Redeemer that became now the symbol of Maratea.

See also 

Christ The Redeemer in Rio de Janeiro.
List of statues of Jesus

References

Mountain monuments and memorials
Colossal statues of Jesus
Buildings and structures in the Province of Potenza
Religious buildings and structures completed in 1965
Marble sculptures in Italy
Outdoor sculptures in Italy
Tourist attractions in Basilicata
1965 sculptures